Oconto – J. Douglas Bake Municipal Airport (KOCQ)  is a public use airport located two nautical miles (4 km) southwest of the central business district of Oconto, a city in Oconto County, Wisconsin, United States. It is owned by Oconto City and County. It is included in the Federal Aviation Administration (FAA) National Plan of Integrated Airport Systems for 2021–2025, in which it is categorized as a local general aviation facility.

Although many U.S. airports use the same three-letter location identifier for the FAA and IATA, this facility is assigned OCQ by the FAA but has no designation from the IATA.

Facilities and aircraft 
Oconto – J. Douglas Bake Municipal Airport (KOCQ) covers an area of 304 acres (123 ha) at an elevation of 604 feet (184 m) above mean sea level. It has two runways: 11/29 is 3,198 by 75 feet (975 x 23 m) with an asphalt surface and 4/22 is 1,840 by 150 feet (561 x 46 m) with a turf surface.

For the 12-month period ending September 14, 2021, the airport had 11,620 aircraft operations, an average of 32 per day: 99% general aviation, 1% air taxi and less than 1% military. In January 2023, there were 23 aircraft based at this airport: all 23 single-engine.

See also 
 List of airports in Wisconsin

References

External links 
  at Wisconsin DOT Airport Directory
 

Airports in Wisconsin
Transportation in Oconto County, Wisconsin